"Deep in My Heart" is a 1990 song that was recorded and produced by the Italian act Clubhouse, featuring Silver Pozzoli on vocals. The single spent one week at number one on the Hot Dance Club Play chart during the week of August 14, 1991, giving the group their first number one on the Billboard chart, although this was their second single in the United States (as they peaked at No. 75 on the Billboard Hot 100 with "Do It Again Medley with Billie Jean"). The single sampled portions of Kier Kirby's vocals (the "Ye Yay" chorus) from Deee-Lite's 1990 single "Power of Love".

Track listing
US release
 Deep in My Heart (Radio Edit by DJ Professor) 3:53  
 Deep in My Heart (Extended Mix by DJ Professor) 6:10  
 Deep in My Heart (American Mix, featuring Eric Kupper [keyboards], Peter Schwartz, and David Morales) 6:30  
 Deep in My Heart (La-Da-De Mix by DJ Professor) 5:38  
 Deep in My Heart (Wax Dub - Vocal, featuring Eric Kupper [keyboards], Peter Schwartz, and David Morales) 7:02  
 Deep in My Heart (Red Zone, featuring Eric Kupper [keyboards], Peter Schwartz, and David Morales) 6:19

Italian release
Deep in My Heart (Extended Mix)  6:21  
Deep in My Heart (Funky House Version)  6:41  
Deep in My Heart (Afro Mix)  6:45

French release
 Deep in My Heart (A Touch of Techno) (Radio Mix)  3:50  
 Deep in My Heart (A Touch of Techno)  6:47  
 Deep in My Heart (Extra House Funky Mix)  6:57  
 
UK release
 Deep in My Heart (Extended Mix)  6:09  
 Deep in My Heart (Funky House Version)  4:12  
 Deep in My Heart (Afro Mix)  6:12

German release (ZYX Records; Metronome released the radio version)
 Deep in My Heart (Extended Mix)  6:21  
 Deep in My Heart (Funky House Version)  4:15  
 Deep in My Heart (Afro Mix)  6:16

Japanese release (Media Records – ALCB 360)
 Deep in My Heart (Extended Mix) 6:13
 Deep in My Heart (Funky House Version) 4:16
 Deep in My Heart (Afro Mix) 6:16
 Deep in My Heart (Radio Edit) 4:14
 Deep in My Heart (Funky Radio) 3:46
 Deep in My Heart (Europe House Mix) 5:30
 Deep in My Heart (A Touch of Techno) 5:40
 Deep in My Heart (Extra House Funky Mix) 5:36
 Deep in My Heart (American 12" Mix) 6:31
 Deep in My Heart (Desert Storm Mix) 4:17
 Deep in My Heart (Red Zone Mix) 6:21

Chart history

References

External links
Original version
Red Zone version

1990 songs
1990 singles
Atlantic Records singles
House music songs
Club House (band) songs
Songs written by Gianfranco Bortolotti
Songs written by Towa Tei